Douglas Hector Haynes  (January 1, 1936 – February 10, 2016) was a Canadian abstract artist and teacher.

Early life 

Haynes was born and raised in Regina, Saskatchewan. He studied at Alberta's Provincial Institute of Technology and Art (now the Alberta College of Art and Design) with Marion Nicoll, Ronald Spickett, and Illingworth Kerr, from 1954-1958, and the Royal Academy of Art, The Hague, Netherlands in 1960-1961.

Career
Haynes first became known for prints and painted constructions using burlap, string and other materials (1963–69).Clement Greenberg wrote approvingly of Haynes' art in 1963, writing: "In Douglas Haynes' touched-up prints I was even more surprised to see the lay-out of Adolph Gottlieb's Burst paintings unabashedly present.... This lay-out was handled, all the same, with a certain felicity, so that I had to conclude that Haynes had added something of his own to the idea by reducing it in size". Speaking of Greenberg in 2006, Haynes remembered "how he didn’t particularly like my Toledo paintings when he first saw them in the studio, but how he told me I was artistically right on when he caught the finished show at the Edmonton Art Gallery."

In 1970 Haynes visited New York City, renewing an interest in the work of Adolph Gottlieb and Robert Motherwell, and shifting his attention to painting. A professor at the University of Alberta from 1970–1995, Haynes mentored generations of local and Canadian visual artists. Elected a member of the Royal Canadian Academy in 1974, Haynes was chairman of the Department of Art and Design at U of A (1976–1980), and ultimately held the title of professor emeritus.

In 2005, Haynes was the subject an episode of the nationally-broadcast art documentary series "Landscape As Muse", and is featured in Roald Nasgaard's 2008 book, "Abstract Painting in Canada." According to Nasgaard, "In 1975 Haynes turned overtly to using colour. In 1977 he met Jack Bush during the latter's retrospective show at the Edmonton Art Gallery, an encounter that set into motion a series of experiments, using some of Bush's devices, in "an attempt to get the colour to spread." The outcome was the Split-Diamond series, which signalled his maturity as a painter".

Exhibitions
Haynes exhibited in many group shows including: The Fifth and Sixth Biennial of Canadian Painting, National Gallery of Canada 1963, 1965; The Canadian Canvas, Time Life Touring Exhibition, 1975; Certain Traditions: Painting and Sculpture of Canada and Great Britain, 1978; Abstraction x 4, Canada House, London England; Bonn, West Germany; Paris, France, 1985; and The Development of Abstract Painting in Canada, Calgary, Alberta, 1993.

Collections
Two monumental paintings by Haynes (titled Promise to Dusk and To Morning Light) adorn either side of the staircase leading to council chambers in Edmonton's City Hall. A group of 13 large paintings in the Art Gallery of Alberta's collection, known as The Toledo Series, was inspired by paintings El Greco made for the Sacristy of the Cathedral of Toledo, Spain,

References

External links 
Official website

1936 births
2016 deaths
Artists from Edmonton
Artists from Regina, Saskatchewan
Canadian abstract artists
20th-century Canadian male artists